Trypaea australiensis, known as the (marine) yabby or ghost nipper in Australia, or as the one-arm bandit due to their occasional abnormally large arm, and as the Australian ghost shrimp elsewhere, is a common species of mud shrimp in south-eastern Australia, the only species in the genus Trypaea. T. australiensis is a popular bait used live or frozen by Australians targeting a range of species.

References

Thalassinidea
Crustaceans of Australia
Monotypic arthropod genera